The women's 100 metres hurdles at the 2003 All-Africa Games were held on October 14–15.

Medalists

Results

Heats
Qualification: First 3 of each heat (Q) and the next 2 fastest (q) qualified for the semifinal.

Wind:Heat 1: +0.2 m/s, Heat 2: +0.2 m/s

Final
Wind: -1.5 m/s

References
Results
Results

100